Phantom Boy is a 2015 animated fantasy film directed by Jean-Loup Felicioli and Alain Gagnol and written by Alain Gagnol. The film stars Édouard Baer, Jean-Pierre Marielle, Audrey Tautou, Jackie Berroyer, Gaspard Gagnol and Noa Bernaoui-Savreux. The film was released in France on October 14, 2015, by Diaphana Films.

Plot

11-year-old Leo, dealing with cancer, reads a bedtime story to his younger sister Lily, before sharing a special secret with her: the illness has given Leo the ability to separate his spirit from his physical body, allowing him to hover and fly through the air in an intangible, invisible, and impalpable form, with his body remaining mostly asleep. He refers to this state as a "Phantom", but if he spends too much time away from his body, he will begin to fade away before disappearing entirely.

Meanwhile, NYPD Lieutenant Alex Tanner is demoted by his boss, Captain Simon, and assigned grunt work after he manages to catch two burglars robbing a supermarket, but blows up part of the building in the process. Leo is taken to the hospital for more tests, as his illness worsens. He laments over the loss of his hair and follows his mother home as a phantom. She weeps over Leo's health but does not let Lily see her cry.

That night, a strange man with a greatly disfigured face makes a phone call to the Mayor. He proceeds to cause a blackout that affects all of New York City: he informs the Mayor the blackout was done by a powerful computer virus he has put into the internet, that will destroy the entire city's infrastructure in the next 24 hours unless he receives a payment of one billion dollars. While the man refers to himself as the King of New York, newspaper outlets begin calling him "The Face". Tanner attempts to apprehend The Face at the docks but is outsmarted and left for dead under a broken crate.

Tanner is taken to a hospital, where his phantom encounters Leo's. Leo guides Tanner's phantom back into his body, as Leo has done for countless other patients, just as Tanner's phantom starts to fade. When Tanner awakens, Leo is amazed to find that Tanner remembers his phantom, as all other patients forget. Tanner meets with Miss Mary Delaney, a reporter with an anonymous lead as to the location of The Face. Leo convinces Tanner to let his phantom tag along since Tanner's leg is still broken.

Mary is ambushed by The Face but manages to escape with the help of Leo's phantom and Tanner (via telephone). Then the two blackmail The Mole, an ex-con on parole, to help Mary look for information pertaining to The Face's whereabouts as Leo's phantom follows. When his phantom returns to the hospital, Leo sees his parents crying and Lily reading to an imaginary version of Leo so she does not get lonely.

The Face captures Mary after The Mole fails to rescue her and is knocked unconscious. The Big Guy and The Little Guy, The Face's henchmen, arrive at the hospital with orders to kill Tanner. Tanner manages to gain the upper hand but The Big Guy runs off with Leo's body. Leo's phantom is able to return just as hospital security arrests the two hitmen. Leo's phantom follows The Face's dog back to the docks. It leads Leo to a ship called Vizir where Mary is held captive.

Nearing midnight, The Face leaves Mary onboard the ship and detonates a bomb. She frantically attempts to stop the virus by guessing the password that will shut it down, eventually succeeding when she realizes from The Face's words that the password is "Eyelids". Tanner and Leo's fading phantom help her escape the sinking ship but The Face returns, enraged over his plan destroyed. During the confrontation, The Face lashes out at his dog, resulting in the dog attacking him. Mary makes it off the ship as it finally sinks.

Leo's phantom races back to the hospital but disappears just outside the building. Spiritless, Leo's body falls into a coma. Tanner, guilty about Leo endangering his life to save Mary, tells her about Leo's abilities. Lily reads one of her bedtime stories to Leo's body, and his spirit is able to return. He tearfully reunites with his family.

Some time later, Tanner's leg has healed and he begins a relationship with Mary. He receives a call from Captain Simon informing him that the Mayor wants to congratulate him with a ceremony and a promotion, much to the Captain's dismay. Back at home, Leo finishes reading Lily a bedtime story and gazes out at the New York City skyline.

Voice cast

Release
The film premiered at the 2015 Toronto International Film Festival on September 12, 2015. The film was released in France on October 14, 2015, by Diaphana Films.

Reception
The website's critics consensus reads, "Stunning animation and old-fashioned charm more than make up for a relative lack of narrative depth." Metacritic, which uses a weighted average, assigned the film a score of 66 out of 100 based on 18 critics, indicating "generally favorable reviews."

References

External links
 
 
 

2015 animated films
2015 films
2015 fantasy films
2010s animated superhero films
2010s French animated films
Belgian animated fantasy films
French animated fantasy films
French superhero films
English-language French films
English-language Belgian films
2010s superhero films
Animated teen superhero films
Folimage films
Anifilm award winners
2010s English-language films